Maia Campbell is an American former film, television actress, singer and model. She is best known for her role as Nicole on the 1994 Fox comedy-drama series South Central and her portrayal of Tiffany Warren in the NBC/UPN sitcom In the House for five seasons (1995–1999).

Early life and career
Born in Takoma Park, Maryland, Campbell is the daughter of author Bebe Moore Campbell and Tiko Campbell, an architect and author from Washington, D.C. She was raised in the Ladera Heights section of Los Angeles. Campbell has become best known for her role as the witty adolescent daughter on the series In the House, though she has been frequently seen on television. She was featured in a regular role as Nicole in the short-lived Fox series South Central, portraying Larenz Tate's girlfriend, and also had a guest role in Thea. She also had a minor role in John Singleton's Poetic Justice, with Janet Jackson, playing the role of Lucky's (played by Tupac Shakur) cousin. Campbell also hosted the young adult magazine show Twenty-four/Seven in 1995. She briefly attended Spelman College in Atlanta, Georgia.

Filmography

Film

Television

Music videos
 LL Cool J – "Ain't Nobody" (1996)
 Lil Kim – "Not Tonight" (1997)
 Tyrese Gibson – "Sweet Lady" (1999)
 Tyrese Gibson – "Lately" (1999)
 Jaheim - "Just In Case" (2001)
 Fat Joe – "What's Luv" (2002)
 Brandy Norwood – "Talk About Our Love" (2004)

Awards and nominations

References

External links
 

Living people
People from Takoma Park, Maryland
20th-century American actresses
21st-century American actresses
Actresses from Florida
Actresses from Maryland
African-American actresses
American television actresses
American film actresses
American child actresses
Spelman College alumni
Year of birth missing (living people)